Ben Solowey (1900–1978) was an American artist, known for his sculpture, painting, and drawing.

He was born in Warsaw, Poland on August 29, 1900. In 1907, his family moved to St. Petersburg, Russia, then, when he was fourteen, to Philadelphia. There he studied under Hugh H. Breckenridge and Daniel Garber at the Pennsylvania Academy of the Fine Arts, from which he graduated in 1923. In 1924, he took a job as ship's steward on the SS Leviathan so that he could go to London and Paris to see both old masters and more recent masterpieces of Impressionism and Post-Impressionism. He was influenced by French artists from Delacroix and Courbet to the impressionists and more modern painters such as Cézanne, as well as the sculptor Auguste Rodin.

In 1925, he returned to Philadelphia, where he worked as a decorative painter.

Solowey moved to New York in 1928, where he was commissioned by The New York Times and the Herald Tribune to capture the likenesses of Broadway and Hollywood celebrities. Of these, he sketched Ethel Barrymore, Fanny Brice, Claudette Colbert, Katharine Cornell, Marlene Dietrich, Helen Hayes, Katharine Hepburn, Walter Huston, George S. Kaufman, Mary Nash, Lily Pons, and Basil Rathbone.

In 1930, after a brief courtship, he married Rae Landis, who became his primary model.

In 1942, the couple moved to a secluded farm in Bucks County, Pennsylvania. There, Solowey would spend the rest of his days, restoring the ancient farmhouse and painting.

His studio in Bedminster Township, Pennsylvania is maintained as a museum.

External links
Biography at Solowey.com

References 

1900 births
1978 deaths
20th-century American painters
American male painters
People from Bucks County, Pennsylvania
20th-century American male artists